Alexis Batle (born 28 July 1971) is a Cuban volleyball player. He competed in the men's tournament at the 1996 Summer Olympics.

References

External links
 

1971 births
Living people
Cuban men's volleyball players
Olympic volleyball players of Cuba
Volleyball players at the 1996 Summer Olympics
Place of birth missing (living people)
Pan American Games medalists in volleyball
Pan American Games gold medalists for Cuba
Pan American Games bronze medalists for Cuba
Medalists at the 1995 Pan American Games
Medalists at the 1999 Pan American Games